Dragons Lair Névé is a névé of about  in the Hays Mountains, bounded by Mount Griffith, Mount Pulitzer, Taylor Ridge, and Vaughan Glacier. The feature was mapped by the United States Geological Survey from surveys and U.S. Navy aerial photographs, 1960–64. In November 1987, the névé was the camp site of the United States Antarctic Research Program – Arizona State University geological party, which suggested the name. The name derives from the setting, surrounded by peaks, and from the appearance of Mount Pulitzer, the profile of which is reminiscent of a dragon.

References 

Snow fields of the Ross Dependency
Amundsen Coast
Névés of Antarctica